Classical Persian dance is a style of concert dance that evolved from courtroom dance. An important factor influencing Persian dance was the Qajar dynasty, which reigned from 1795 to 1925. In this period, that dance began to be called "classical Persian dance". Dancers performed artistic dances in the court of the Shah for entertainment purposes such as coronations, marriage celebrations, and Norouz celebrations (Iranian new year). The rise of the Qadjars liberalizes people's attitudes toward dancing, although it remained in the royal court and among the elite and bourgeois families. The court dancers elevated respect for dance to an art form.

Costuming generally consisted of loosely fitted long dress with long sleeves, worn with a jacket. The jacket extended over the sides of the hips and was either worn open or closed. The Qadjar dancers wore pants under the dress. A purely Persian pant was cut narrow and cuffed and loose at the bottom. Sometimes a Turkish harem pant was worn, extremely full and gathered tight at the ankles. The fabrics were bright in color and flowered. The Shah rewarded performers with jewels, so many costumes had elaborate gold embroidery, pearl beading and gemstones. Upon the head was worn an egret, a small paisley-shaped hat adorned with jewels, pearls and a feather. Hair was worn long and elaborate, with side locks and bangs fashioned into shapes.

Traditionally, the music was played by a small band with one or two melodic instruments and a drum. In the 20th century, the music came to be orchestrated and dance movement and costuming gained a modernistic orientation to the West. In 1928, ballet came to Iran and impacted dance performance, adding a feeling of lightness and more delicate footwork. The jacket was flared more fully at the hips much like a tutu, and the dance form became more modern in outlook and flourished as a performing art.

References

Iranian dances
Concert dance
Qajar Iran
Iranian inventions